Parrhasius moctezuma is a butterfly of the family Lycaenidae. It was described by Harry Kendon Clench in 1971. It is found in Mexico.

References

Butterflies described in 1971
Eumaeini